Oscar Kelly Allen Sr. (August 8, 1882 – January 28, 1936), also known as O. K. Allen, was the 42nd Governor of Louisiana from 1932 to 1936.

Career 
He was elected to the Louisiana state Senate in 1928 in the wake of Huey Long's landslide victory in the gubernatorial election. He defeated the anti-Long incumbent, former Republican Henry E. Hardtner of La Salle Parish. Allen served as Long's floor leader in the Senate; he was also appointed by the governor as chairman of the Louisiana Highway Commission, serving from 1928 until 1930. His appointment was legally challenged. In the litigation that reached the Louisiana Supreme Court, it ruled that holding both legislative and executive positions simultaneously was unconstitutional. Allen resigned as chairman.

Allen was elected governor in the shadow of Huey Long, who had resigned after being elected as US Senator from Louisiana and relocated to Washington, D.C.. Allen was considered a political stooge for former governor Long. His brother Earl Long once joked that a leaf blew into Allen's office one day and that he signed it, thinking it was legislation from Long.

Death and honors
Allen died in the governor's mansion of a brain hemorrhage. One week before his death, he won the Democratic nomination in the special election to fill the vacancy in the U.S. Senate caused by Huey Long's assassination.

Allen was the namesake of the O.K. Allen Bridge across the Red River between Alexandria and Pineville. The bridge was imploded on September 26, 2015, due to construction on a new bridge to be named the Curtis-Coleman Memorial Bridge.

The former governor is honored, along with a predecessor, Huey P. Long, by the Huey P. Long - O. K. Allen Bridge across the Mississippi River in Baton Rouge, as well as the Long-Allen Bridge over the Red River between Shreveport and Bossier City, among others.

References

External links
 Winn Parish Enterprise, from 1/30/36, on Gov. Allen's funeral and obituary
 "Oscar Kelly Allen 1932-1936", State of Louisiana - Biography.
 Cemetery Memorial by La-Cemeteries

"Oscar K. Allen," A Dictionary of Louisiana Biography, Vol. I (1988), p. 10

1882 births
1936 deaths
People from Winn Parish, Louisiana
Baptists from Louisiana
Democratic Party governors of Louisiana
Farmers from Louisiana
Businesspeople from Louisiana
Educators from Louisiana
Trinity University (Texas) alumni
20th-century American politicians
People from Pleasant Hill, Sabine Parish, Louisiana
20th-century American businesspeople
20th-century Baptists